Evgeny Alexandrovich Klimov (born 22 November 1993) is a Russian curler from Saint Petersburg. He played alternate for the Russian national men's curling team at the 2017 Winter Universiade.

Awards
 Russian Men's Curling Championship: Gold (2014, 2019), Silver (2015, 2016).
 Russian Men's Curling Cup: Silver (2013, 2014, 2020).
 Russian Mixed Curling Championship: Gold (2015, 2020).
 Master of Sports of Russia (2014)
 Master of Sports of Russia, International Class (2016)

Personal life 
Klimov was a student of the Lesgaft National State University of Physical Education, Sport and Health (Saint Petersburg). He is married.

Teammates
2017 Winter Universiade
 Alexey Timofeev, Fourth, Skip
 Timur Gadzhikhanov, Third
 Artur Razhabov, Second
 Artur Ali, Lead

References

External links 

Living people
1993 births
Russian male curlers
Curlers from Saint Petersburg
People from Slantsy
Curlers at the 2022 Winter Olympics
Olympic curlers of Russia
Competitors at the 2017 Winter Universiade